This is an overview of publishers that mainly published National Socialist works until the end of the Second World War.

Notes

Lists of organizations
Publishers
Publishers